Yukovo is a rural locality (a village) in Nikolskoye Rural Settlement, Ust-Kubinsky District, Vologda Oblast, Russia. The population was 7 as of 2002.

Geography 
The distance to Ustye is 34 km, to Nikolskoye is 1 km. Nikolskoye is the nearest rural locality.

References 

Rural localities in Ust-Kubinsky District